Nanette Newman (born 29 May 1934) is an English actress and author. She appeared in nine films directed by her husband Bryan Forbes, including Séance on a Wet Afternoon (1964), The Whisperers (1967), Deadfall (1968), The Stepford Wives (1975) and International Velvet (1978), for which she won the Evening Standard Film Award for Best Actress. She was also nominated for the BAFTA Award for Best Actress in a Leading Role for another Forbes directed film, The Raging Moon (1971).

Early life
Newman was born in Northampton, Northamptonshire, England. Her parents were in show business, with her father being a reputed circus strongman. In the 1940s, she lived in Pullman Court, Streatham Hill. Newman was educated at Sternhold College, the Italia Conti Academy of Theatre Arts stage school and the Royal Academy of Dramatic Art in London.

Career
Newman made her first screen appearance at age 11 in the 1945 short Here We Come Gathering: A Story of the Kentish Orchards. She appears in 1962 in the TV series Sir Francis Drake as Yana, a South American tribal native whose tribe is enslaved by the Spanish.

Her feature film debut as a teenager was in Personal Affair (1953). There followed a number of period roles, including the heroine in The Wrong Box (1966); The Madwoman of Chaillot (1969); The Raging Moon (1971), as a young woman in a wheelchair; and International Velvet (1978).  In addition to her screen roles, she made a guest appearance as the female lead, Geraldine McCloud, in an episode of The Saint (TV series) (Series 3-01, "The Miracle Tea Party").

Newman married actor-writer-director Bryan Forbes in 1955. She acted with Forbes in The League of Gentlemen (1960), which Forbes also scripted, and went on to appear in most of the feature films that Forbes directed, including The L-Shaped Room (1962), Seance on a Wet Afternoon (1964), The Wrong Box (1966), The Whisperers (1967), Deadfall (1968), The Madwoman of Chaillot (1969), The Raging Moon (1971), The Stepford Wives (1975) and International Velvet (1978).

In his 1983 book Adventures in the Screen Trade, scriptwriter William Goldman was critical of the fact that Forbes cast his wife (then in her early forties) as Carol, one of the robotic spouses in The Stepford Wives, and revealed that it led to a major rift between them. In Goldman's original script (of which, he claimed, about 75% was re-written by Forbes), the android replacement wives were meant to be like (Playboy) "Playmates come to life", the acme of youth and beauty, dressed in skimpy tennis shorts and T-shirts. Although Goldman conceded that Newman was both a good actress and attractive, she clearly did not fit his conception of the part ("a sex bomb she isn't"), and he objected to Forbes's decision to change the appearance of the 'wives' (making them older, more demure and much more conservatively dressed), expressing the view that Newman's casting "destroyed the reality of a story that was only precariously real to begin with". Goldman also recounted his misgivings about casting an Englishwoman to play an American – although, in the event, Newman delivered a perfect accent, and few viewers would have realised she was not American.

Newman is from a variety background, acting on stage and also appearing in television advertisements, including for Fairy Liquid. She was also a popular regular panellist on a revival of the BBC panel game show What's My Line? (1973–74). She also starred in the ITV sitcom Let There Be Love which ran for two seasons, in 1982 and 1983.

In 1990, she was a contestant on Cluedo, facing off against Edward Hardwicke. 

She is the author of thirty children's books and six cookery books; winning a Cookbook of the Year Award with The Summer Cookbook, and presented a children's television cookery programme, Fun Food Factory (1976), she appeared in the 1980s on TVam, cooking during the show.

Personal life
Newman met actor-writer-director Bryan Forbes in February 1954 on location at Marylebone railway shunting yards, while Forbes was co-starring in the film Wheel of Fate. Newman, then still at RADA, had been sent along for a job:

Newman and Forbes married on 27 August 1955, and had two daughters, Emma Forbes and Sarah Standing. They were married for 57 years, until Forbes's death in 2013. In her first interview after Forbes's death, Newman explained that one of the reasons they were able to keep their marriage together was Forbes's rule that he always took his family with him if he was working overseas for any period longer than two weeks.

Filmography

 Personal Affair (1953)
 The League of Gentlemen (1960)
 Faces in the Dark (1960)
 The Rebel (1961)
 House of Mystery (1961)
 Pit of Darkness (1961)
 The L-Shaped Room (1962)
 Twice Round the Daffodils (1962)
 The Painted Smile (1962)
 The Wrong Arm of the Law (1963)
 Séance on a Wet Afternoon (1964)
 Of Human Bondage (1964)
 The Wrong Box (1966)
 The Whisperers (1967)
 Deadfall (1968)
 Journey into Darkness (1968)
 Captain Nemo and the Underwater City (1969)
 The Madwoman of Chaillot (1969)
 Oh! What a Lovely War (1969)
 The Raging Moon (1971)
 The Love Ban (1973)
 Man at the Top (1973)
 The Stepford Wives (1975)
 International Velvet (1978)
 Restless Natives (1985)
 The Mystery of Edwin Drood (1993)

References

External links
 

 Nanette Newman Fairy Liquid Commercial on YouTube

1934 births
Actors from Northamptonshire
Alumni of the Italia Conti Academy of Theatre Arts
Alumni of RADA
English film actresses
English food writers
English television actresses
English television presenters
Living people
People from Northampton